Baegaksan is a mountain between the county of Goesan, Chungcheongbuk-do and the city of Sangju, Gyeongsangbuk-do in South Korea.

See also
List of mountains in Korea

Notes

References

Mountains of North Chungcheong Province
Mountains of North Gyeongsang Province
Goesan County
Sangju
Mountains of South Korea